Paul Leslie Cameron (born August 17, 1932) is an American former professional football player who was a defensive back for one season with the Pittsburgh Steelers of the National Football League. He was drafted by the Pittsburgh Steelers in the eighth round of the 1954 NFL Draft. Cameron played college football at the University of California, Los Angeles and attended Burbank High School in Burbank, California. He was a Consensus All-American in 1953. Cameron was third in Heisman Trophy voting in 1953 and sixth in 1952.

He lettered at UCLA in 1951, 1952 and 1953.

References

External links
Just Sports Stats

Living people
1932 births
Players of American football from California
American players of Canadian football
American football defensive backs
American football halfbacks
Canadian football defensive backs
Canadian football quarterbacks
UCLA Bruins football players
Pittsburgh Steelers players
BC Lions players
All-American college football players
Sportspeople from Burbank, California